Omphaliaster borealis is a species of fungus in the family Tricholomataceae, and the type species of the genus Omphaliaster. First described in 1967 as Rhodocybe borealis, it was transferred to Omphaliaster in 1971.

See also

List of Tricholomataceae genera

References

External links

Tricholomataceae
Fungi described in 1967